Ahern Peak is located in the Lewis Range, Glacier National Park in the U.S. state of Montana. The mountain was named after George Patrick Ahern.  Ahern Peak is immediately southwest of Helen Lake and straddles the Continental Divide. Ahern Glacier lies just north of the peak.

See also
 Mountains and mountain ranges of Glacier National Park (U.S.)

References

Mountains of Glacier County, Montana
Mountains of Glacier National Park (U.S.)
Lewis Range
Mountains of Montana